The Croatian War of Independence has been the subject of a number of feature films and documentaries. Those include:

 Dezerter ("The Deserter"), 1992 Serbian film that covers the Battle of Vukovar
 Kaži zašto me ostavi ("Why Have You Left Me?"), 1993 Serbian film that covers the Battle of Vukovar
 Vukovar, jedna priča ("Vukovar: A Story"), 1994 Serbian film
 Vukovar se vraća kući ("Vukovar: The Way Home"), 1994 Croatian film
 The Death of Yugoslavia, a 1995 BBC documentary that covers the collapse of the former Yugoslavia
 How the War Started on My Island, a 1996 black comedy by Vinko Brešan
 The ER TV series character Dr. Luka Kovač, played by Goran Višnjić, first appeared on the series in 1999. The character lost his wife and children in the war. They were killed when an artillery shell hit their house.
 Il carniere ("The Game Bag"), 1997 Italian film
Madonna (Croatian: Bogorodica) - 1999 Croatian film
 Harrison's Flowers, a 2000 movie by Élie Chouraqui about a war reporter in 1991
 Oluja nad Krajinom ("Storm over Krajina"), a 2001 Croatian documentary that covers Operation Storm
Witnesses - 2003 Croatian drama 
 Glave dole ruke na leđa ("Heads down hands on your back"), a 2003 B92 documentary which deals with the prison camps in Serbia
 Hrvatska ljubavi moja ("Croatia my love"), a 2006 documentary by Jakov Sedlar that covers the relationship of postwar Croatia and the ICTY
 The Unit, a 2006 B92 documentary about "Red Berets", a Serb paramilitary unit
 Vukovar – Final Cut, a 2006 B92 documentary about the siege of Vukovar, won the Human Rights Award at the 2006 Sarajevo Film Festival.
 War for Peace, a 2007 Montenegrin documentary about the siege of Dubrovnik.
 Zapamtite Vukovar ("Remember Vukovar"), 2008 Croatian film directed by Fadil Hadžić, shown at the 2008 Pula Film Festival
 Zaustavljeni glas ("The stopped voice"), a 2010 Croatian documentary that covers the siege of Vukovar and the death of Siniša Glavašević
 Korak po korak ("Step by step"), a 2011 Croatian movie, shown at the 58th Pula Film Festival
 Rat za Dubrovnik ("War for Dubrovnik"), a 2011 Montenegrin documentary on the siege of Dubrovnik.
 Osijek – nepokoreni grad ("Osijek – the undefeated city"), a 2012 Croatian documentary covering wartime events in Osijek in the period of 27 June 1991 – 15 January 1992.
 Rosinjača - a 2011 Croatian documentary covering a battle fought in the Rosinjača Forest near Osijek on 5 December 1991.
 Šlep za rasute terete ("Bulk Cargo Barge") - a 2012 Croatian documentary on evacuation of civilians from Dalj, Erdut and Aljmaš, following 1 August 1991 Dalj massacre
 Number 55 - 2014 feature on ambush of a Croatian patrol in the village of Kusonje in September 1991.
Godina Oluje ("The Year of The Storm") - 2015 HRT's four part documentary series covering diplomatic, political and military aspects of late stages of the war in Croatia and Bosnia and Herzegovina.
Deblokada Dubrovnika (Lifting the Siege of Dubrovnik) - is 2017 two part HRT's documentary film covering Croatian Army's efforts in Operation Tiger in 1992. 
Maslenica - 2018 two part HRT's documentary covering Operation Maslenica
The General -  2019 biography/war drama by Antun Vrdoljak about life of general Ante Gotovina. In 2019 The General was the most expensive Croatian movie ever made.
Nestali - 2019 HRT four part miniseries following group of Croatian soldiers stranded behind enemy lines ten days before Operation Storm.
Šesti autobus ("The Sixth Bus") - 2022 Croatian film about a young American journalist who interviews veterans of Battle of Vukovar in search of her father who went missing during the battle.

References

Sources
 
 
 
 
 

Film
Yugoslav Wars films
Lists of films by topic